The Mercyhurst Lakers represented Mercyhurst University in CHA women's ice hockey during the 2018-19 NCAA Division I women's ice hockey season.

Offseason
Kennedy Blair was selected to participate in the US National Team's Goalie Development Camp.

Recruiting

Standings

Roster

2018–19 Lakers

Schedule

|-
!colspan=12 style=""| Regular Season

|-
!colspan=12 style="background:#0a2351; "| CHA Tournament

Awards and honors

Sarah Hine was named the CHA /best Defensive Forward.
Emma Nuutinen was selected for the CHA All-Conference First Team.

References

Mercyhurst
Mercyhurst Lakers women's ice hockey seasons
Mercy
Mercy